Aghavan is a 2019 Indian Tamil-language mystery-thriller film written and directed by APG Elumalai on his directorial debut. The film stars Kishore Ravichandran, Chirashree Anchan and Nithya Shetty in the lead roles. C. Sathya composed the music for the film, while cinematography was handled by Bala Palaniappan.

Plot 
Hero Kishore Ravichandran works in a temple and does all kinds of work to wash away his sins, at least that's what he tells his colleague (Thambi Ramaiah). Only in the second half we come to know that Kishore is an undercover cop who safeguards the temple from an organized criminal gang who sketches a master plan to loot the wealth hidden ages back. Kishore's friend is a research scholar who does a doctorate on the hidden secret of Raja Raja Cholan, so our hero should save him tool!

Cast 
 Kishore Ravichandran
 Naren V.
 Chirashree Anchan
 Nithya Shetty
 Thambi Ramaiah
 Chinni Jayanth
 R. N. R. Manohar

Production 
The film is directed by APG Elumalai, a former assistant of film director Prabhu Solomon and insisted that the film is based on temple tale, implies the conflict between good and evil inside the human beings. The film is predominantly shot in Agasteeswarar Temple, Kolapakkam and the plot of the story is developed inside the temple.

The filmmakers roped in Kannada Actress Chirashree & Telugu actress Nithya M Shetty to play the female leads in the film and in fact the film marks the Tamil acting debut for both of them.

Marketing 
The official teaser of the film was unveiled on 4 February 2019.

Reception 
The Times of India gave the film one-and-half out of five stars and wrote that "The several flashback episodes and multiple non-linear narrations confuse the audience, and the never-ending screenplay makes things worse".

References

External links 

2010s Tamil-language films
2010s mystery thriller films
Indian mystery thriller films
2019 films